Round Square is an international network of schools, based on the educational concepts of Kurt Hahn, and named after a distinctive building at Gordonstoun. Founded by a group of seven schools in the late 1960s, by 1996 it had grown to 20 member schools worldwide, and has since expanded to over 200 schools. Round Square is incorporated in England as a Company Limited by Guarantee, and is a registered charity.

History
Between 1962 and 1963 Jocelin Winthrop Young and Roy McComish listed all the schools which they considered to have adopted the educational ideas of Kurt Hahn or had included them at their foundation. These schools were: in Scotland, Rannoch School and Dunrobin School; in England, Abbotsholme School, Battisborough and Milton Abbey; in Germany Louisenlund; in Switzerland Aiglon College, in Ghana Achimota School; in India The Doon School; and the soon to open Athenian School in California. Salem, Gordonstoun, Anavryta and Box Hill were 'taken for granted' as the already established and pre-eminent Hahnian schools.

On 5 June 1966, Kurt Hahn’s 80th birthday was celebrated at Schule Schloss Salem, and as the headmaster of the school Winthrop Young invited the headmasters of Box Hill School, Gordonstoun, Louisenlund, Anavryta, Battisborough, the Athenian School and the Atlantic College to discuss the establishment of a Hahn schools conference. This meeting was chaired by King Constantine and during its course an agreement was reached on naming the conference "The Hahn Schools", it was then decided that the first conference would be held at Gordonstoun in 1967. At this first conference at Hahn's insistence the name "The Hahn Schools" was dropped in favour of a new name "The Round Square" after an iconic building at Gordounstoun. Six of the schools that attended this first conference and were the founding members of the Round Square: Box Hill School, Gordonstoun, Anavryta Experimental Lyceum, Schule Schloss Salem, Aiglon College and Abbotsholme School. At the 2nd Round Square conference held at Box Hill the principles of the association were established and co-education was the first of the sequence of conference themes that were discussed. At a later conference held at Box Hill in 1980 the R.S.I.S. (Round Square International Service) was created to promote and organise overseas voluntary service projects in much the same way as the project in Cephalonia. Winthrop Young retired as headmaster of Salem in 1974 but continued to run the Round Square association as Honorary Secretary and later as Director until he retired from that position in 1992.

Activities
Round Square schools encourage students to take part in a range of community service activities both locally and internationally. Many projects are run through the school and further opportunities are available via the Round Square Region, Network and Worldwide Organisation. The philosophy of Round Square is centered on the 6 IDEALS, namely the Spirit of Internationalism, the Spirit of Democracy, the Spirit of Environment, the Spirit of Adventure, the Spirit of Leadership, and finally, the Spirit of Service. The goal is to develop a sense of responsible leadership and deeper understanding of democratic practice.

Member schools

References

Educational institutions established in 1966
Associations of schools